Nicanor (Nīkā́nōr) lived in 4th century BC and was a friend and a general for Ptolemy, the son of Lagus, who was dispatched by the Ptolemaic Egyptian king in 320 BC with an army to reduce Syria and Phoenicia. He took Laomedon, the governor of those provinces, prisoner.

References
Smith, William (editor); Dictionary of Greek and Roman Biography and Mythology, "Nicanor (8)", Boston, (1867)

Notes

 

Ptolemaic generals
Ancient Macedonian generals
4th-century BC Macedonians